The 2003 Jigawa State gubernatorial election occurred in Nigeria on April 19, 2003. The ANPP nominee Ibrahim Saminu Turaki won the election, defeating Mohammed Alkali of the PDP.

Ibrahim Saminu Turaki emerged ANPP candidate. He picked Ibrahim Hassan Hadejia as his running mate. Mohammed Alkali was the PDP candidate with Ahmed Adulhamid Madori as his running mate.

Electoral system
The Governor of Jigawa State is elected using the plurality voting system.

Primary election

ANPP primary
The ANPP primary election was won by Ibrahim Saminu Turaki. He picked Ibrahim Hassan Hadejia as his running mate.

PDP primary
The PDP primary election was won by Mohammed Alkali. He picked Ahmed Adulhamid Madori as his running mate.

Results
A total number of 5 candidates registered with the Independent National Electoral Commission to contest in the election.

The total number of registered voters in the state was 1,636,657. Total number of votes cast was 1,205,518, while number of valid votes was 1,109,536. Rejected votes were 95,982.

References 

Jigawa State gubernatorial elections
Jigawa State gubernatorial election
Jigawa State gubernatorial election
Jigawa State gubernatorial election